

Lepidosaurs

Archosaurs

Classification Events
 Harry Govier Seeley divides the Dinosaurs into two taxa based on the configuration of their hip bones.

Newly named dinosaurs

Plesiosaurs

New taxa

Plants
The Fossil Grove was discovered in Glasgow, Scotland. It contains the fossilised stumps of eleven extinct Lepidodendron trees, which are sometimes described as "giant club mosses" but they may be more closely related to quillworts.

Paleontologists
 Death of George Bax Holmes, a wealthy fossil collector who collaborated with Sir Richard Owen. His collection remains preserved in Brighton's Booth Museum of Natural History.

References